Johan Skjoldborg (27 April 1861 – 22 February 1936) was a Danish educator, novelist, playwright and memoirist.

Biography
Johan Martinus Nielsen Skjoldborg was born in the parish of Øsløs in Thisted in north Jutland, Denmark.
He was educated in Nibe and later trained as a teacher at  Ranum Seminarium  in Ranum. He was employed as  a school teacher until he  resigned in 1902. In his later years he lived in a house which was donated to him in Løgstør. Johan Skjoldborg's childhood home in Øsløs was opened as a museum in 1961 on the centenary of his birth.

Among his works are the novel En Stridsmand from 1896, the play Slægten from 1925, and the two volumes Min Mindebog from 1934/1935.

References

Further reading

External links
 
Skjoldborgs Hus  website

1861 births
1936 deaths
People from Thisted Municipality
Danish educators
19th-century Danish memoirists
19th-century male writers
20th-century Danish memoirists
Danish male novelists
Danish male dramatists and playwrights
19th-century Danish dramatists and playwrights
19th-century Danish novelists
20th-century Danish novelists
20th-century Danish male writers
20th-century Danish dramatists and playwrights